Gerardo Damián Arce (born 6 July 1991) is an Argentine professional footballer who last played for Santiago Wanderers in the Primera B de Chile as a midfielder.

Career
Arce played for Boca Juniors' youth team. Deportivo Riestra of Primera D became Arce's first senior club in 2012. He remained for one year, 2012–13, and scored eighteen goals in thirty-four matches as the club missed out on promotion in the final versus Ituzaingó. In July 2013, Arce joined Primera B Metropolitana's Almagro. He made his professional debut on 19 August during a home loss to Atlanta, prior to scoring his opening Almagro goal against Barracas Central on 14 October. In total, Arce scored twelve times in eighty-eight games in three seasons with Almagro. January 2016 saw Arce join Argentine Primera División side Quilmes.

Four appearances followed before he left Quilmes. Arce subsequently joined Patronato. He scored on his second start, in a 4–2 victory over Arsenal de Sarandí. Arce scored four further goals in eighteen matches for Patronato in 2016–17. On 16 July 2017, Unión Santa Fe signed Arce. However, he departed six months later following zero first-team appearances for the club; appearing as an unused substitute in the Primera División twice in September. San Martín of Primera B Nacional became Arce's sixth senior career club in January 2018. He sealed a return to Almagro on 30 June 2018; a team now in Primera B Nacional.

Career statistics
.

References

External links

1991 births
Living people
People from Ezeiza, Buenos Aires
Argentine footballers
Argentine expatriate footballers
Association football midfielders
Primera D Metropolitana players
Primera B Metropolitana players
Argentine Primera División players
Primera Nacional players
Chilean Primera División players
Primera B de Chile players
Deportivo Riestra players
Club Almagro players
Quilmes Atlético Club footballers
Club Atlético Patronato footballers
Unión de Santa Fe footballers
San Martín de Tucumán footballers
Instituto footballers
Santiago Wanderers footballers
Expatriate footballers in Chile
Argentine expatriate sportspeople in Chile
Sportspeople from Buenos Aires Province